Kamen-na-Obi, known until 1933 as Kamen, is a town in Altai Krai, Russia, located on the left bank of the Ob River  northwest of Barnaul, the administrative center of the krai. As of the 2010 Census, its population was 43,888.

History
It was founded in 1751 as the village of Kamen (lit. stone) and granted town status in 1915. The former Kamen-na-Obi (air base) is nearby.

Administrative and municipal status
Within the framework of administrative divisions, Kamen-na-Obi serves as the administrative center of Kamensky District. As an administrative division, it is, together with one rural locality (the station of Plotinnaya), incorporated within Kamensky District as the town of district significance of Kamen-na-Obi. As a municipal division, the town of district significance of Kamen-na-Obi is incorporated within Kamensky Municipal District as Kamen-na-Obi Urban Settlement.

As an administrative division, prior to September 2015 Kamen-na-Obi and Plotinnaya were incorporated separately into the town of krai significance of Kamen-na-Obi—an administrative unit with the status equal to that of the districts. As a municipal division, the town of krai significance of Kamen-na-Obi was incorporated as Kamen-na-Obi Urban Okrug. The status of both units was changed in September 2015, when the town of krai significance was demoted to a town of district significance and subordinated to Kamensky District, while the urban okrug was demoted to an urban settlement within Kamensky Municipal District.

Economy
The main industries are food-processing and brick and furniture manufacture.

Climate

References

Notes

Sources

External links

Official website of Kamen-na-Obi 
Kamen-na-Obi Business Directory 

Cities and towns in Altai Krai
Populated places established in 1751
1751 establishments in the Russian Empire
Populated places on the Ob River